Oscar R. Knutson (October 9, 1899 – June 15, 1981) was an American lawyer and judge from Minnesota.

Early life and education
Oscar Rudolph Knutson was born in Superior, Wisconsin. He was the son of  Bottolf Knutson (1865-1940) and Rachel (Satren) Knutson (1864-1929), both of whom  were immigrants from Norway. The son of immigrant parents, he did not learn to speak English until he entered school. He graduated from Warren, Minnesota High School in 1920 and attended St. Olaf College and the Northwestern School of Agriculture (now University of Minnesota Crookston), graduating from the University of Minnesota Law School in 1927.

Career
Knutson practiced law in Warren with Julius J. Olson, who also became a Minnesota Supreme Court justice.

Knutson ran unsuccessfully for Marshall County Attorney in 1930. He was elected mayor of Warren, Minnesota in 1936 and was re-elected twice. While mayor of Warren, Knutson and two partners purchased the Warren Telephone Company, which they operated until 1949. He was appointed a district court judge in 1941 by Governor Harold Stassen. He won election to the post in 1942. On May 7, 1948, he was appointed to the Minnesota Supreme Court by Governor Luther Youngdahl, succeeding Olson. He won election later that year and was re-elected in 1954 and 1960. On January 25, 1962, he was appointed Chief Justice by Governor Elmer L. Andersen and was elected in 1964 and re-elected in 1970. In 1962, he received the Alumni Award  from St Olaf College.  He retired in 1973.

Later life and death
After retiring from the Court, Knutson lost his eyesight as a result of a stroke. He died during 1981. He was buried at Greenwood Cemetery at Warren in 
Marshall County, Minnesota.

Personal life
Knutson married Louise Halvorson (1897-1955) in 1934. They had four children, Richard, Robert, Harold, and Anne. After Louise died, Knutson married Katherine Mellby Anderson in 1968. She was the granddaughter of Judge Andrew Grindeland of Warren, MN.

References

Other sources
Chief Justice Oscar Knutson Obituary Star Tribune, Published June 17, 1981

1899 births
1981 deaths
People from Warren, Minnesota
People from Superior, Wisconsin
Mayors of places in Minnesota
Minnesota state court judges
Minnesota lawyers
American Lutherans
American people of Norwegian descent
Chief Justices of the Minnesota Supreme Court
St. Olaf College alumni
University of Minnesota Crookston alumni
University of Minnesota Law School alumni
20th-century American judges
20th-century American lawyers
20th-century Lutherans